Magzum Maratuly Myrzagaliev (born 7 November 1978) is a Kazakh politician who has served as Minister of Energy (2021-2022). Prior to that, he was the Minister of Ecology, Geology and Natural Resources from 2019 and in the ministry as Vice after working in engineering and managing national company businesses. April 14, 2022 - he was appointed as a Chairman of the Board of JSC NC KazMunayGas.

Biography

Early life and education 
Myrzagaliev was born in Alma-Ata (now Almaty). He studied at the Republican Physics-Mathematics State School and in 1999, Myrzagaliev graduated from the Turan University with a degree in international economics. In 2003, he graduated from the Diplomatic Academy of the Ministry of Foreign Affairs of the Republic of Kazakhstan with the same specialty as an international economist. In parallel with his studies at the Turan University, Myrzagaliev studied at the Caspian State University of Technologies and Engineering, specializing in "Development of oil and gas fields".

Career 
Myrzagaliev began his work experience in 1997 as a manager at Zhartas LLP. From 2000 to 2001, he worked in the Forest and Biological Resources Management of the Akmola Region.

In 2001, he was hired as an engineer for drilling fluids MIDrillingFluids International (Schlumberger) at the Tengiz field. In 2002, Myrzagaliev was selected for the company's career development program from the Kazakh branch of Schlumberger, and was trained in the United States, Malaysia, in the fields of Western Siberia. After returning to Kazakhstan, he worked as a business development manager, then was appointed head of the MIDrillingFluids International branch in Kazakhstan. 

From 2007 to 2010, Myrzagaliev worked as the general director of TenizService LLP of the National Company KazMunayGas. In 2010, he became a managing director of the company. From 2012 to 2013, Myrzagaliev served as a deputy chairman of the Board for Innovative Development and Service Projects of KazMunayGas.

On 24 October 2013, he was appointed to civil service as Vice Minister of Oil and Gas and from 13 August 2014, he served as Vice Minister of Energy. By the decree of the President of Kazakhstan Kassym-Jomart Tokayev, the Ministry of Ecology, Geology and Natural Resources was created with Mirzagaliyev being appointed to the post of a Minister in the new department on 17 June 2019. On 9 September 2021, he was transferred to the post of Minister of Energy, succeeding Nurlan Nogaev.

On April 14, 2022, he was appointed as a Chairman of the Board of JSC NC KazMunayGas.

References 

1978 births
Living people
People from Almaty
Government ministers of Kazakhstan
Ministers of Energy (Kazakhstan)